Shalvey is a suburb of Blacktown, in the state of New South Wales, Australia. Shalvey is located 48 kilometres west of the Sydney central business district, in the local government area of the City of Blacktown and is part of the Greater Western Sydney region.

History
Shalvey takes its name from the main road in the area which was originally a crown subdivisional road. The road was named after Patrick Shalvey (1866–1962) who was a large landholder and ran an abattoir there to service his butcher shops in the city.

Housing
Housing is very heavily dominated by public housing under the control of the NSW Department of Housing built throughout the 1960s and 1970s, with a large number of extensive terrace-style complexes. These are gradually transferring to private ownership and as this continues these government-built premises are being replaced with privately built, modern homes, similar to those being built in other areas of Sydney.

Commercial area
Shalvey has a small shopping complex known as Shalvey Shops. There is a supermarket/liquor drive through, chemist, doctor, bakery, barber, pizza, Chinese take away/restaurant and takeaway shops and BP service station with fully equipped mechanical workshop

Politics

For federal elections, Shalvey is in the safe Labor electoral division of Chifley. This seat is currently held by Ed Husic, of the Australian Labor Party, who was elected in the 2010 elections. The seat has been held continuously by the Labor Party since it was proclaimed in 1969

For NSW state elections, Shalvey is in the electoral division of Mount Druitt. This seat is currently held by Edmond Atalla, of the Labor Party.

References

Suburbs of Sydney
City of Blacktown